Usseglio is a comune (municipality) in the Metropolitan City of Turin in the Italian region Piedmont, located about  northwest of Turin, on the border with France. It borders with the following municipalities: Balme, Bessans (France), Bruzolo, Bussoleno, Chianocco, Condove, Lemie, Mompantero, Novalesa.

What to do 
Usseglio hosts the only Miniature golf 18 holes course in the area with night-time lighting and table tennis tables.

See also 
 Punta Sulè
 Rocciamelone
 Lago di Malciaussia
Viù

References

Cities and towns in Piedmont